The 2010 Diamond League season was the first season of the Diamond League, an annual series of fourteen one-day track and field meetings. The series began on 14 May in Doha, Qatar and ended on 27 August in Brussels, Belgium.

Superseding the European-centred IAAF Golden League, the Diamond League was the IAAF's first intercontinental series of one-day track and field meetings. Expanding upon the idea of the former Golden League jackpot, there were 32 separate Diamond Races, involving 16 men's and 16 women's track and field events – each of the events featured seven times only over the course of the fourteen meetings of the 2010 Diamond League, and the best athlete in each event won a Diamond Trophy. The total available prize money for the series was US$6.63 million.

For infrastructure reasons the men's and women's hammer throw events were not included in the IAAF Diamond League. For this reason the IAAF created a Hammer Throw challenge.

For the first time, some of the world's foremost track and field athletes were centrally contracted to an athletics meeting series. For the 2010 series the contracted athletes – called Diamond League Ambassadors – included figures such as Usain Bolt, Kenenisa Bekele, Yelena Isinbayeva and Blanka Vlašić.

Prior to the series, former World Champion Steve Cram stated that he believed that, through greater television exposure, and mutual responsibility between the IAAF and promoters, the 2010 Diamond League would raise the profile of the sport of athletics.

Meeting calendar

Ambassadors
A total of fourteen athletes were given Diamond League Ambassador status, with the intention of bringing attention to some of the sport's foremost competitors. There are seven male and seven female athletes, and the division between track and field specialists is also evenly divided.

Results

Men

Track

In Oslo, Eugene and London, mile races are counted to the Diamond League standings for the 1500m.

Field

Women

Track

In Lausanne and Monaco, 3000m races are counted to the Diamond League standings for the 5000m.

Field

References

Results
Results Archive. IAAF Diamond League (archived). Retrieved on 2015-05-17.

External links
Official website
IAAF review of competition: Part 1, Part 2, Part 3

 
Diamond
Diamond League